Pleun Raaijmakers (born 15 April 1997) is a Dutch footballer who plays as a midfielder for ADO Den Haag in the Eredivisie.

Club career

International career

Personal life
Raaijmakers was born in Oirschot.

Honours

Club

International

References

Living people
Dutch women's footballers
Eredivisie (women) players
1997 births
People from Oirschot
Women's association football midfielders
ADO Den Haag (women) players
PSV (women) players
Footballers from North Brabant